Elio Ballesi (22 September 1920 – 20 October 1971) was an Italian politician who served as a Deputy (1954–1963), Senator (1968–1971) and Mayor of Macerata for two terms (1956–1957, 1965–1967).

References

1933 births
1971 deaths
Mayors of Macerata
Deputies of Legislature II of Italy
Deputies of Legislature III of Italy
Senators of Legislature V of Italy